Guildayichthyidae is a prehistoric family of marine fish from the Mississippian Bear Gulch Limestone of Montana. It is the only family in the order Guildayichthyiformes. Guildayichthyids possess an uncommon mixture of primitive and modern characteristics in their skull bones.

Taxonomy
This family consists of the following genera and species:

 Genus Guildayichthys Lund, 2000
 Species Guildayichthys carnegiei Lund, 2000
 Genus Discoserra Lund, 2000
 Species Discoserra pectinodon Lund, 2000

References

 
Prehistoric fish of North America
Prehistoric ray-finned fish families